Bass River State Forest is a  state park in Ocean County, New Jersey, United States. The park, named for the Bass River which crosses through it, shelters a portion of the environmentally sensitive Pine Barrens but also provides a variety of recreational resources to visitors. The park is operated and maintained by the New Jersey Division of Parks and Forestry.

History
The first of New Jersey's state forests, Bass River State Forest was acquired by the New Jersey Legislature in 1905 for public recreation, water conservation, and wildlife and timber management. The lands were once occupied by the Absegami, a branch of the Lenape tribe of Native Americans in the United States.

Lake Absegami
The  Lake Absegami, created in the 1930s, provides swimming, boating and canoeing.

Absegami Natural Area
A trail through the  Absegami Natural Area provides access to a pine/oak woods and a small Atlantic white cedar bog, also containing red maples and magnolias.

West Pine Plains Natural Area
The  West Pine Plains Natural Area preserves a pygmy forest, a globally rare stunted forest ecosystem consisting of pine and oak trees that reach a canopy height of as little as four feet at maturity. The forest supports the endangered broom crowberry and twelve rare species of moth.

Batona Trail
The  Batona Trail passes through the park, as well as nearby Wharton and Brendan T. Byrne State Forests.

See also

List of New Jersey state parks

References

External links
 NY-NJTC: Bass River State Forest Trail Details and Info

New Jersey state forests
Protected areas of the Pine Barrens (New Jersey)
Parks in Ocean County, New Jersey